This is a list of renamed places in Malawi.

Country 
The British colony of Nyasaland was renamed Malawi upon independence in 1964.

Cities and towns 
 Fort Hill → Chitipa (1964)
 Fort Johnston → Mangochi (1964)
 Fort Manning → Mchinji (1964)
 Mlanje → Mulanje
 Kota Kota → Nkhotakota
 Port Herald → Nsanje
 Fort Lister → Phalombe (1964)

See also 
 Lists of renamed places

References 

Geography of Malawi
History of Malawi
Malawi
Malawi, renamed places
Malawi geography-related lists
Malawi
Malawi